is a  video game, developed by Access and published by Atlus, which was released exclusively in Japan in 1996.

This was the last game released for the Super Famicom by Atlus.

See also 
 Shotest Shogi
 List of shogi video games

References

External links 
 Pro Kishi Jinsei Simulation: Shōgi no Hanamichi at superfamicom.org
 Pro Kishi Jinsei Simulation: Shōgi no Hanamichi at super-famicom.jp 

1996 video games
Atlus games
Japan-exclusive video games
Shogi video games
Super Nintendo Entertainment System games
Super Nintendo Entertainment System-only games
Multiplayer and single-player video games
Video games developed in Japan